Warszawa Śródmieście station may be a reference to one of two stations in Warsaw, Poland:

 Warszawa Śródmieście PKP station
 Warszawa Śródmieście WKD station